Ralph Wheelwright (September 11, 1898 - April 15, 1971) was an American producer and screenwriter. He was nominated for an Academy Award in the category Best Original Screenplay for the film Man of a Thousand Faces. Wheelwright died in April 1971 at Saint John's Health Center in Santa Monica, California, at the age of 72.

Selected filmography 
 Man of a Thousand Faces (1957; co-nominated with Robert Wright Campbell, Ivan Goff and Ben Roberts)

References

External links 

1898 births
1971 deaths
People from Brooklyn
American male screenwriters
Screenwriters from New York (state)
Film producers from New York (state)
American film producers
20th-century American male writers